Acacia drewiana is a shrub of the genus Acacia and the subgenus Pulchellae that is endemic to an area of south western Australia.

Description
It blooms from April to July and produces yellow flowers. The simple inflorescences occur singly in the axils with large spherical flower-heads containing 22 to 35 densely packed golden flowers.

Taxonomy
There are two recognised subspecies:
 Acacia drewiana subsp. drewiana
 Acacia drewiana subsp. minor

Distribution
It is native to an area in the Wheatbelt and Peel regions of Western Australia where it is commonly situated in low lying areas growing in gravelly or sandy soils. The range of the plant extends from around Eneabba in the north down to around Mundijong in the south and out to around also Wongan Hills and Newdegate in the east.

See also
 List of Acacia species

References

drewiana
Acacias of Western Australia
Taxa named by William Vincent Fitzgerald
Plants described in 1917